Michael Price (born 29 April 1982) is a Welsh former footballer who played in the Football League for Hull City.

References

Welsh footballers
English Football League players
1982 births
Living people
Everton F.C. players
Hull City A.F.C. players
North Ferriby United A.F.C. players
Barnet F.C. players
Scarborough F.C. players
Leigh Genesis F.C. players
National League (English football) players
Association football defenders